Galina Chernyshova (born 21 November 1993) is a Russian road cyclist, who currently rides for Russian amateur team .

Major results

2015
 3rd Grand Prix of Maykop
2019
 7th Pannonhalma, V4 Ladies Series
2020
 3rd Grand Prix Gazipaşa
 9th Grand Prix World's Best High Altitude
 9th Grand Prix Central Anatolia

References

External links

1993 births
Living people
Russian female cyclists